James Deuchar (26 June 1930 – 9 September 1993) was a Scottish jazz trumpeter and big band arranger, born in Dundee, Scotland. He found fame as a performer and arranger in the 1950s and 1960s. Deuchar was taught trumpet by John Lynch, who learned bugle playing as a boy soldier in the First World War, and who later was Director of Brass Music for Dundee.

Career
After National Service at Padgate, Warrington, England, Deuchar worked with the British modern jazz unit the Johnny Dankworth Seven. In the 1950s, he worked with a number of commercial bands, such as the Oscar Rabin Band, and also intermittently with Ronnie Scott. In the late 1950s, he worked with Kurt Edelhagen's orchestra in Germany.

He returned to the UK and worked again with Scott (1960–62) and with Tubby Hayes (1962–66). As a highly gifted player and a leading exponent of the "modern" style, he was in some demand and achieved success as a touring player in Europe and the United States. He also "sat in" with leading American players at Ronnie Scott's club as musical exchanges were liberalised at the start of the 1960s.

He returned to work with Edelhagen in 1966. In the 1960s and early 1970s, he also worked with The Kenny Clarke-Francy Boland Big Band, featuring leading European and expatriate American musicians. He returned to London around 1971, working freelance, and then to Dundee in the mid-1970s. He continued to arrange, play and guest in a number of settings, including the BBC Big Band in London and the BBC Scottish Radio Orchestra in Glasgow, until his health deteriorated. 

He died in 1993, aged 63.

Discography

As leader
 Jimmy Deuchar (Discovery, 1953)
 Pal Jimmy! (Tempo 1957, re released on Jasmine, 2002)
 Pub Crawling with Jimmy Deuchar (Contemporary, 1957)
 Music in the Making (Jasmine, 2001)
 Opus de Funk (Jasmine, 2001)
 The Anglo/American/Scottish Connection (Hep, 2004)

As guest
With Victor Feldman
 Suite Sixteen (Contemporary, 1955 [1958])
With Tubby Hayes
 1955 Swinging Giant, Vol. 1
 1962 Late Spot at Scott's
 1963 A Tribute: Tubbs
 1966 Night and Day
 2005 England's Late Jazz Great
 2005 Live in London, Vol. 2
 2007 The Little Giant
 2011 Dancing in the Dark

With Kenny Clarke/Francy Boland Big Band
 Jazz Is Universal (Atlantic, 1962)
 Handle with Care (Atlantic, 1963)
 Now Hear Our Meanin' (Columbia, 1963 [1965])
 Swing, Waltz, Swing (Philips, 1966)
 Sax No End (SABA, 1967)
 Out of the Folk Bag (Columbia, 1967)
 17 Men and Their Music (Campi, 1967)
 All Smiles (MPS, 1968)
 Faces (MPS, 1969)
 Latin Kaleidoscope (MPS, 1969)
 Fellini 712 (MPS, 1969)
 Let's Face the Music and Dance (1969)
 Big Band Sound of Kenny Clarke & Francy Boland (1973)

With others
 1961 Live at Ronnie Scott's, Zoot Sims
 1965 Now Hear Our Meanin' , Kenny Clarke
 1966 Sound Venture, Georgie Fame/Harry South Big Band
 1967 Fire, Heat, Soul and Guts, Kenny Clarke
 1968 Trip to the Mars, Orchester Roland Kovac
 1969 Ray Warleigh's First Album, Ray Warleigh
 1970 Midnight Mood, Mark Murphy
 1986 Live at Fulham Town Hall, Charlie Watts
 1989 Roarin' , Jack Sharpe
 2004 Swing Revisited, Johnny Keating
 2007 An Ace Face, Allen Eager

References

Sources
 John Chilton, Who's Who of British Jazz, Cassell, London, 1997, 
 Carr, Fairweather & Priestley, Jazz - the Essential Companion, Grafton Books, London, 1987, 

Hard bop trumpeters
Bebop trumpeters
Scottish jazz trumpeters
Male trumpeters
Musicians from Dundee
1930 births
1993 deaths
20th-century Scottish musicians
20th-century trumpeters
20th-century British male musicians
British male jazz musicians
Kenny Clarke/Francy Boland Big Band members
Oscar Rabin Band members
Contemporary Records artists
Hep Records artists